Almeda Riddle (November 21, 1898 – June 30, 1986) was an American folk singer. Born and raised in Cleburne County, Arkansas, she learned music from her father, a fiddler and a teacher of shape note singing. She collected and sang traditional ballads throughout her life, usually unaccompanied. Introduced to a wider public by folklorist John Quincy Wolf and musicologist Alan Lomax, Riddle recorded extensively, and claimed to be able to perform over 500 songs.

She was born Almeda James and was a first cousin twice removed of the outlaws Frank and Jesse James. On a recording of the song "Jesse James" she noted, "I'm sure you've read of Frank and Jesse James. Well, my father's grandfather and their father (Robert S. James) was brothers. I never was ashamed of the James boys was my cousins, but neither was I proud of it." In old age, she was often known as Granny Riddle.

In October 1959, on Wolf's recommendation, Lomax and Shirley Collins recorded Riddle at her home in Heber Springs in The Ozarks. The 23 songs reflected Lomax's interest in traditional ballads and songs for children. Collins recalls:
She was a singer of such composure and quiet intensity, that you were compelled to listen. ... There was such clarity in her style, and she had that rare and admirable quality of serving the songs, rather than the songs serving her.

Children's songs from this session  were issued on American Folk Songs For Children in the Atlantic Records' Southern Folk Heritage series of LPs and was reissued as the Atlantic Records box set Southern Folk Heritage.  In 1964 she recorded Songs And Ballads Of The Ozarks for Vanguard Records. Several of her ballads were issued on various albums in the Prestige Records Southern Journey series of LPs, and reissued on CDs in the Rounder Records series Southern Journey: The Alan Lomax Collection. These records made Almeda Riddle widely known to participants in the American folk music revival. From 1962 onward she accepted invitations to perform at folk festivals and college campuses. She toured extensively for twenty years until prevented by ill health.

In 1970 Riddle co-authored with folklorist Roger D. Abrahams an autobiography titled A Singer and Her Songs that included many of her songs. In 1972 and 1978, she made studio recordings for Rounder Records, which were issued on two solo LPs.

Riddle was a recipient of a 1983 National Heritage Fellowship awarded by the National Endowment for the Arts, which is the United States government's highest honor in the folk and traditional arts. In 1984 she was filmed by George West for Folkstreams. In the film titled Almeda Riddle: Now Let's Talk About Singing (released in 1985), she sang and spoke about her life and songs.

In December 1984 she moved into a nursing home in Heber Springs, where she died on June 30, 1986. She is buried next to her husband at Shiloh Cross Roads Cemetery.

The introduction to the 1997 cult film Gummo features Riddle's rendition of "I Love My Rooster."

Discography
Songs And Ballads Of The Ozarks (Vanguard Records) 1964       
Ballads And Hymns From The Ozarks (Rounder Records)   1972      
More Ballads And Hymns From The Ozarks (Rounder Records) 1976      
Granny Riddle's Songs And Ballads (Minstrel) 1977       
My Old Cottage Home (reissue of Ballads & Hymns from the Ozarks) (Albatros) 1979       
How Firm A Foundation (Arkansas Traditions)   1985

References

External links
 Almeda Riddle: Now Let's Talk About Singing (film)
 Almeda Riddle Letters -- University of Arkansas Libraries
 The John Quincy Wolf Collection: Ozark Folksongs
 
 

1898 births
1986 deaths
People from Heber Springs, Arkansas
American folk singers
20th-century American women singers
National Heritage Fellowship winners
Rounder Records artists
Atlantic Records artists
Prestige Records artists
Singers from Arkansas
20th-century American singers